Gustav Küstermann (May 24, 1850 – December 25, 1919) was a U.S. Representative from Wisconsin.

Biography
Born in Detmold, Lippe-Detmold, Küstermann graduated from high school and worked at a store in Hamburg, Germany before immigrating to the United States when he was 18.

Kustermann worked at a St. Louis, Missouri hardware store for several months before moving to Green Bay, Wisconsin. He worked as the bookkeeper for the Green Bay Advocate newspaper, and later owned and operated his own store dealing in musical instruments, stationery and other items. He served on the board of directors of the Citizens National Bank, and was an officer of the Green Bay  Businessmen's Association.

A Republican, Kustermann served on the Green Bay City Council and as the City Treasurer. He later served on the Brown County Board of Supervisors, and was a member and President of the state Board of Control.  He was twice an unsuccessful candidate for Congress, and served as Postmaster of Green Bay during the administration of Benjamin Harrison.

Küstermann was elected to the Sixtieth and Sixty-first United States Congresses (March 4, 1907 - March 3, 1911). He represented Wisconsin's 9th congressional district. He was defeated for reelection to the Sixty-second Congress.

He died in Green Bay on December 25, 1919 and is buried in Allouez, Wisconsin's Woodlawn Cemetery.

References

External links

 

1850 births
1919 deaths
Businesspeople from Wisconsin
German emigrants to the United States
Politicians from Green Bay, Wisconsin
Wisconsin city council members
County supervisors in Wisconsin
Republican Party members of the United States House of Representatives from Wisconsin
Wisconsin postmasters
19th-century American politicians
19th-century American businesspeople